The Grand Cornier is a  mountain in the Pennine Alps in Switzerland.

The first ascent of the mountain was made via the east ridge by Edward Whymper, Christian Almer, Michel Croz and F. Biner on 16 June 1865.

The Mountet hut and Moiry hut are used for the normal ascent routes.

See also

List of mountains of the Alps above 3000 m
List of mountains of Switzerland

References
Collomb, Robin G., Pennine Alps Central, London: Alpine Club, 1975

External links

Mountains of the Alps
Alpine three-thousanders
Mountains of Valais
Pennine Alps
Mountains of Switzerland
Three-thousanders of Switzerland